In organic chemistry, tetraaminoethylene is a hypothetical, organic compound with formula  or .  Like all  polyamines that are geminal, this compound has never been synthesised and is believed to be extremely unstable.

However, there are many stable compounds that can be viewed as derivatives of tetraaminoethylene, with various organic functional groups substituted for some or all hydrogen atoms.  These compounds, which have the general formula , are collectively called tetraaminoethylenes.

Tetraaminoethylenes are important in organic chemistry as dimers of diaminocarbenes, a type of stable carbene with the general formula .

Reactions

 Tetraaminoethylenes react with acids to give formamidinium salts.
 Tetraaminoethylenes react with oxygen to give urea derivatives (R2N)2C=O.  A notorious example is the spontaneous reaction of Tetrakis(dimethylamino)ethylene ((H3C)2N)2C=C(N(CH3)2)2 in air with emission of a green-blue light, which was used by downed US Navy pilots to signal for help in World War II.

References

Enamines
Hypothetical chemical compounds